The Foo Pass is a mountain pass of the Glarus Alps, located on the border between the Swiss cantons of St. Gallen and Glarus, at an elevation of . It crosses the col between the peaks of Foostock and Piz Sardona.

The trail forms part of the Alpine Pass Route, a long-distance hiking trail across Switzerland between Sargans and Montreux.

The alpine pasture below the pass on the St Gallen side is notable for its marmot colony.

See also
 List of mountain passes in Switzerland

References

External links

Foo Pass on Via Alpina web site
Foopass on Hikr web site
Crossing Foo Pass from MySwitzerland web site

Mountain passes of Switzerland
Mountain passes of the Alps
Mountain passes of the canton of Glarus
Mountain passes of the canton of St. Gallen
Glarus–St. Gallen border